Jhanji is a small semi-rural area situated in Sivasagar and Jorhat districts. The river Jhanji River divides these two districts.

History 
The river Jhanji is famous from the time of Ahom kingdom in Assam. It physically divides Jorhat and Sivasagar districts of Assam.The word Jhanji is an Assamese compound word. In Assamese, Jhanji means "jhanjori kohiyua nodi"; the river which flows waste products of flood. In the time of flood it carries away trees, mud, etc. So it was named as Jhanji.

In old bihu songs such as Jibon Jaji noi and Jhanji noi eribo nuwaru, the Jhanji river is mentioned. Tamulichiga, Bhogamukh, and Khonamukh are three famous places on the banks of the Jhanji river.

Geography 
Jhanji is located at 26.894N94.420E

Politics 
Jhanji is part of the 103rd Amguri Legislative Assembly.
Jhanji is part of the Jorhat (Lok Sabha constituency).

Educational institutions

Colleges 
Jhanji Hemnath Sarma College, Jhanji Jamuguri
Ghana Kanta Borah College, Tamulichiga
Hanhchara Junior College, Jhanji Hanhchara

Schools 
Jhanji Higher Secondary School, Sivasagar
Chandradhar Gogoi Shankardev Shishu Vidya Niketan, Jhanji, Sivasagar
Jhanji Girls High School, Sivasagar
Jhanji Hanhchara High School, Jorhat
Jarabari High School, Sivasagar

Notable Personalities
Tirthanath Sarma, renowned litterateur of Assam, former president of Assam Sahitya Sabha, Makum venue.
Satyendranath Sarma, famous Assamese litterateur, former president of Assam Sahitya Sabha, Titabor venue.
 Chandra Prasad Saikia, renowned Assamese writer
Kapil Thakur, Assamese lyricist, he wrote some famous Assamese songs like 'Maya Mathu Maya' etc. Father of Zubeen Garg.
Zubeen Garg, his ancestral home is at Jhanji Tamulisiga.
Binanda Chandra Barua, known as Dhwanikabi, his workplace was Jhanji HS school. He wrote the famous poem 'Rangoli Burhir Daan' in memory of an Ahom soldier 'Rangamua' of Jhanji Jamuguri.
Jagannath Mahanta, notable Satriya dancer, research scholar.
Chitralata Phukan, renowned Assamese writer.

References 

Villages in Sivasagar district